Cioropcani is a commune in Ungheni District, Moldova. It is composed of three villages: Bulhac, Cioropcani and Stolniceni.

References

Communes of Ungheni District